The George Washington University Law School (GW Law) is the law school of George Washington University, in Washington, D.C. Established in 1865, GW Law is the oldest top law school in the national capital. GW Law offers the largest range of courses in the US, with 275 elective courses in business and finance law, environmental law, government procurement law, intellectual property law, international comparative law, litigation and dispute resolution, and national security and U.S. foreign relations law. Admissions are highly selective as the law school receives thousands of applications. In 2020, the acceptance rate was 21%.

GW Law has an alumni network that includes notable people within the fields of law and government, including the former U.S. Attorney General, the former U.S. Secretary of the Interior, foreign heads of state, judges of the International Court of Justice, ministers of foreign affairs, a Director-General of the World Intellectual Property Organization, a Director of the CIA, members of U.S. Congress, U.S. State Governors, four Directors of the FBI, and numerous Federal judges. The law school publishes nine student-run journals and hosts highly ranked skills competitions, such as the Van Vleck Constitutional Law Moot Court Competition. In 2020 GW was ranked as the 11th best moot court program in the country and regularly hosts a U.S. Supreme Court justice on its three-judge panel.

The 2023 U.S. News & World Report ranks GW Law as the 25th top law school in the United States. The National Law Journal ranked GW Law 21st for law schools that sent the highest percentage of new graduates to NLJ 250 law firms, the largest and most prominent law practices in the U.S.

History

The George Washington University Law School was founded in the 1820s but closed in 1826 due to low enrollment. The law school's first two professors were William Cranch, chief justice of the Circuit Court for the District of Columbia and second reporter of the U.S. Supreme Court, and William Thomas Carroll, a descendant of Charles Carroll the Settler and clerk of the U.S. Supreme Court from 1827 until his death in 1863. The law school was reestablished in 1865 and was the first law school in the District of Columbia.

Law classes resumed in 1865 in the Old Trinity Episcopal Church, and the school graduated its first class of 60 students in 1867. The Master of Laws degree program was adopted by the school in 1897. In 1900, the school was one of the founding members of the Association of American Law Schools. In 1954, it merged with National University School of Law of Washington. The law school operated under the name National Law Center for the 37 years from 1959 to 1996, when it was renamed George Washington University Law School.

Supreme Court Justices Clarence Thomas, William Strong, David J. Brewer, Willis Van Devanter, and John Marshall Harlan were among those who served on its faculty. Chief Justice John Roberts, Justice Antonin Scalia, Justice Elena Kagan, Justice Sonia Sotomayor, and Justice Samuel Alito presided over its moot court in 2006, 2007, 2009, 2012, 2014, and 2016.

GW Law has the oldest intellectual property program in the country, with alumni having written patents for some of the greatest technological achievements of the past 130 years—including the Wright brothers' flying machine, patented on May 22, 1906.

The school was accredited by the American Bar Association in 1923 and was a charter member of the Association of American Law Schools.

National University School of Law
The National University School of Law was merged into the George Washington University School of Law in 1954. The school was founded in 1869. Many alumni served in prominent political and legal positions throughout the school's history.

Academics

Curriculum

J.D. students are required to take courses on civil procedure, criminal law, constitutional law, contracts, introduction to advocacy, legal research and writing, professional responsibility and ethics, property, and torts.

GW Law offers more than 275 elective courses each year. The school boasts particularly robust offerings in business and finance law, environmental law, government procurement law, intellectual property law, international comparative law, litigation and dispute resolution, and national security and U.S. foreign relations law.

GW Law also offers numerous summer programs, including a joint program with the University of Oxford for the study of international human rights law at New College, Oxford each July.

Degrees offered
In addition to the Juris Doctor degree, GW Law offers the following joint degrees:
J.D./M.B.A. with the School of Business
J.D./Master of Public Administration with the Trachtenberg School of Public Policy and Public Administration
J.D./Master of Public Policy with the Trachtenberg School of Public Policy and Public Administration
J.D./M.A. with the Columbian College of Arts and Sciences in History (with a concentration in U.S. Legal History), in Women's Studies, or in Public Policy (with a concentration in Women's Studies)
J.D./M.A. with the Elliott School of International Affairs
J.D./Master of Public Health with the Milken Institute School of Public Health
J.D./Public Health Certificate with the Milken Institute School of Public Health

The school also offers Master of Laws (LL.M.) in Environmental Law, Business and Finance Law, International Environmental Law, Government Procurement and Environmental Law, Intellectual Property Law, International and Comparative Law, Government Procurement Law, Litigation and Dispute Resolution, and National Security and U.S. Foreign Relations Law. The Doctor of Juridical Science (S.J.D.) is offered to a very limited number of candidates.

Student recognition
Instead of supplying students with individual class rankings, GW Law recognizes academic performance with two scholar designations. The top 1–15% of the class is designated George Washington Scholars while the top 16–35% of the class is designated Thurgood Marshall Scholars.

Publications
GW Law publishes nine journals:
 The George Washington Law Review
 The George Washington International Law Review
 The George Washington Business & Finance Law Review
 The Federal Circuit Bar Journal
 The American Intellectual Property Law Association Quarterly Journal
 The Public Contract Law Journal
 The Federal Communications Law Journal
 The Journal of Energy and Environmental Law
 International Law in Domestic Courts Journal

Student life
With more than 1,600 J.D. students enrolled in the 2013–2014 academic year, GW Law had the fifth largest J.D. enrollment of all ABA-accredited law schools.

In the 2013–2014 academic year, 25.2% of GW Law students were minorities and 46.2% were female.

Students enrolled in the J.D. program come from 206 colleges and 11 countries. The law school also enrolls students from approximately 45 countries each year in its Master of Laws and Doctor of Juridical Science degree programs.

GW Law students can participate in 60 student groups.

Campus

GW Law is located in the heart of Washington's Foggy Bottom neighborhood, across the street from the World Bank and International Monetary Fund headquarters, and a few blocks away from the State Department and the White House.

The Jacob Burns Law Library holds a collection of more than 700,000 volumes.

In 2000, the law school began a major building and renovation plan. The school has expanded into buildings on the east side of the University Yard.

The law school currently occupies nine buildings on the main campus of The George Washington University.  The law school's main complex comprises five buildings anchored by Stockton Hall (1924) located on the University Yard, the central open space of GW's urban campus. Renovated extensively between 2001 and 2003, these buildings adjoin one another, have internal passageways, and function as one consolidated complex. Three townhouses directly across from the main complex house the Community Legal Clinics, Student Bar Association, and student journal offices.

Admissions
For the class entering in the fall of 2019, 2,488 out of 8,019 J.D. applicants (31%) were offered admission, with 489 matriculating. The 25th and 75th LSAT percentiles for the 2019 full-time entering class were 160 and 167, respectively, with a median of 166 (93rd percentile). The 25th and 75th undergraduate GPA percentiles were 3.40 and 3.84, respectively, with a median of 3.74. In the 2018–19 academic year, GW Law had 1,525 J.D. students, of which 25% were minorities and 51% were female.

In order to apply for the J.D. program, students must have taken the LSAT within the past five years and must submit a personal statement and at least one letter of recommendation. The GRE is also accepted instead of the LSAT. An applicant with scores for both the GRE and LSAT will have its LSAT score reviewed. Applications are considered on a rolling basis starting in October and must be submitted by March 1.

U.S. Supreme Court clerkships

Since 2005, GW Law has had seven alumni serve as judicial clerks at the U.S. Supreme Court, one of the most distinguished appointments a law school graduate can obtain. This record gives GW Law a ranking of 14th among all law schools nationwide (out of 204 ABA-approved law schools) for supplying such law clerks for the period between 2005 and 2017.

GW Law has placed 27 clerks at the U.S. Supreme Court in its history, including in the 1930s Francis R. Kirkham, later partner at Pillsbury, Madison & Sutro in San Francisco and then general counsel to Standard Oil of California, and Reynolds Robertson, who worked for Cravath, deGersdorff, Swaine & Wood in New York City, both co-authors of a seminal work on the Court's jurisdiction.

Post-graduation employment 
According to GW Law's official 2019 ABA-required disclosures, 73.6% of the Class of 2019 obtained full-time, long-term, bar passage-required, non-school funded employment ten months after graduation.

GW Law's Law School Transparency under-employment score is 12.1%, indicating the percentage of the Class of 2019 unemployed, pursuing an additional degree, or working in a non-professional, short-term, or part-time job ten months after graduation. 0.6% of graduates were in school-funded jobs. 89.5% of the Class of 2019 was employed in some capacity, 1.4% were pursuing a graduate degree, and 6.8% were unemployed and seeking employment.

The main employment destinations for 2019 GW Law graduates were Washington, D.C., New York City, and Virginia.

Costs
The total cost of full-time attendance (indicating the cost of tuition, fees, and living expenses) at GW Law for the 2018-2019 academic year was $88,340. GW Law's tuition and fees on average increased by 4.1% annually over the past five years.

The Law School Transparency estimated debt-financed cost of attendance for three years is $328,263. The average indebtedness of the 76% of 2013 GW Law graduates who took out loans was $123,693.

Rankings
GW Law is ranked #25 in the 2023 Law School Rankings of U.S. News & World Report. GW Law ranks #5 for its international law program, #5 for intellectual property law, #2 for part-time law, and #10 for environmental law.

The National Law Journal ranked GW Law 21st in its 2014 Go-To Law Schools list, a ranking of which law schools sent the highest percentage of new graduates to NLJ 250 law firms.

According to Brian Leiter's law school rankings, GW Law ranked 17th in the nation for Supreme Court clerkship placement between 2003 and 2013, 19th in terms of student numerical quality, and 16th for law faculties with the most "scholarly impact" as measured by numbers of citations.

Notable people

Notable faculty

Notable faculty members include:
Clarence Thomas
John Banzhaf
Jerome A. Barron
Paul Schiff Berman
Thomas Buergenthal
Steve Charnovitz
Mary Cheh
Donald C. Clarke
Lawrence Cunningham
William Kovacic
Alan Morrison
Ralph Oman
Richard J. Pierce
Randall Ray Rader
Charles Henry Robb
Jeffrey Rosen
Catherine J. Ross
Lisa M. Schenck
Jonathan Turley
Daniel Solove

References

External links

 
Law schools in Washington, D.C.
Educational institutions established in 1865
1865 establishments in Washington, D.C.